Sir Augustus John Foster, 1st Baronet,  (1 or 4 December 1780 – 1 August 1848) was a British diplomat and politician.  Born into a notable British family, Foster served in a variety of diplomatic functions in continental Europe and the United States, interrupted by a short stint as a Member of Parliament.  He wrote about his American experiences in Notes on the United States of America.

Early life and family
Foster was born in 1780, possibly in Ireland, and went on to study at Drogheda Grammar School and Christ Church, Oxford.  He enjoyed a comfortable social situation; his father was the Irish MP for Ennis, John Thomas Foster (d. 1796), first cousin of John Foster and William Foster, and his mother Elizabeth Hervey, who would later go on to marry William Cavendish, 5th Duke of Devonshire, was herself the daughter of Frederick Hervey, 4th Earl of Bristol.  Augustus had one older brother, Frederick (1777–1853) and an elder sister Elizabeth (b. 1778), who died several days after birth, as well as two illegitimate half-siblings.  Augustus's parents separated in 1781, at which time he and his brother remained in the care of his father.

On 18 March 1815, one year after his arrival in Denmark, he married Albina Jane Hobart. (b. 2 May 1788  d. 28 May 1867) daughter of Hon. George Vere Hobart (b. 1761 d. 5 December 1802), second son of George Hobart, 3rd Earl of Buckinghamshire, having previously courted Anne Isabella Milbanke (later 11th Baroness Wentworth and wife of Lord Byron). They would go on to have three sons: 
 Frederick George (2nd Bt) (b. 3 January 1816  d. 25 December 1857),
 Cavendish Harvey (Rev'd) (3rd Bt) (b. 7 May 1817 d. 27 Nov 1890) and
 Vere Henry Louis (the philanthropist and educationalist) (b. 25 April 1819  d. 21 December 1900).

Career
Between roughly 1802 and 1804 Foster served as the Secretary to British legation, Naples, Kingdom of the Two Sicilies.  In 1805 he was sent to the United States as the Secretary to British legation, leaving in 1807 to become British chargé d'affaires, Stockholm, Sweden from 1808 to 1810.  He was sent back to America in 1811 as Minister Plenipotentiary to the United States, and while there penned letters to President Madison and his cabinet protesting American incursions in Spanish West and East Florida. He returned to Britain in 1812 with the outbreak of the War of 1812, where he was promptly elected by Cockermouth, England to the House of Commons.

In 1814 he left for Copenhagen, Denmark, where he would serve as British minister plenipotentiary until 1824.

In 1822 he became a Privy Councillor.  Following his decade in Denmark, he returned to Italy as British minister plenipotentiary to Turin, Kingdom of Sardinia where he would stay from 1824 to 1840.  During this time he was knighted by King George IV (1825) and named Baronet of Glyde Court, Ardee (1831), a town in County Louth, Ireland.

Later life
Ending his service in Turin and his career in the British diplomatic service in 1840, Foster began drafting his Notes on the United States of America.

Foster died in 1848 after cutting his throat at Branksea Castle; he had suffered from delirium because of poor health, and his death was ruled as the result of temporary insanity.  His Notes on the United States of America would be rediscovered in a cupboard of his family's home in Northern Ireland in the 1930s, and published posthumously.

Ancestry

Works

References

External links

Footnotes 

1780 births
1848 deaths
Ambassadors of the United Kingdom to the United States
Members of the Parliament of the United Kingdom for English constituencies
UK MPs 1812–1818
Baronets in the Baronetage of the United Kingdom
Suicides by sharp instrument in England
Ambassadors of the United Kingdom to Denmark
British politicians who committed suicide
Members of the Privy Council of the United Kingdom
1840s suicides